The Lai Autonomous District Council (LADC) is one of the three Autonomous District Councils in Mizoram state in north-east India. It covers the Lawngtlai and Sangau subdivisions of the Lawngtlai district. It is an autonomous district council for the Lai people living in south-eastern Mizoram. The LADC's headquarters are in Lawngtlai town, which is the district capital of the Lawngtlai district.

History
In 1954 the Central and Assam governments established a regional council, the Pawi Lakher Regional Council (PLRC), for the Lakher ( Mara), Pawi (a.k.a. Lai), and Chakma peoples. However, the PLRC could not function properly from its beginning as there was no common language among the three tribal communities to understand each other. The first meeting was held where the language used was Mizo, but the Chakmas and Maras hardly understood anything, and the Maras boycotted PLRC meetings in 1958. In 1972, the issue was resolved by dividing the PLRC into three regional councils before becoming district counils.

Structure
The Lai Autonomous District Council has a total strength of 29 members, out of which 25 are directly elected by the people and four are nominated by the governor on the recommendation of the chief executive member of the LADC.

See also
 Chakma Autonomous District Council
 Mara Autonomous District Council
 Hill tribes of Northeast India
 North Eastern Council

References

External links
Lai Autonomous District Council

1972 establishments in Mizoram
Autonomous district councils of India
Lawngtlai
Government of Mizoram